Off-model is a term used in the animation and visual arts industries to describe art that does not match the style, design, or proportions that have been previously established for a given project (i.e. any work that is not on-model). Any kind of visual art can be off-model, so long as it defies the conventions of an established design. Consequently, art can be made off-model accidentally, due to skill or time constraints that may limit an artist's ability to accurately replicate a style. However, off-model can also be an intentional choice on the part of an animator. John Kricfalusi has argued that off-model animation allows originality and can help a scene come to life, as strictly sticking to poses and expressions as dictated in model sheets can be too restricting.

Off-model art is often associated with 2D animation, such as cartoons and anime. For much of the history of 2D animation, individual frames have been hand-drawn in sequence. This task may be outsourced to multiple individuals or studios, increasing the chances for the miscommunication of character, environment, or item design. Animation studios attempt to limit this issue by distributing model sheets amongst animators, which may include poses or expressions for artist reference.

Off-model work may also be the product of artists or cartoonists intending to parody another franchise but not wishing to incur a lawsuit or commit copyright infringement by drawing someone else's trademarked characters.

See also 
 Uncanny Valley

References 

Animation
Animation studios